Norbert István Bódis (born 18 March 1996) is a Romanian football player of Hungarian descent who currently plays for Balmazújvárosi FC.

Club career
On 23 September 2017 he was signed by Nemzeti Bajnokság I club Balmazújvárosi FC.

Club statistics

Updated to games played as of 19 May 2019.

References 

 
 
 Bódis István at HLSZ 
 

1997 births
Living people
People from Zalău
Hungarian footballers
Romanian sportspeople of Hungarian descent
Association football midfielders
Balmazújvárosi FC players
Nemzeti Bajnokság I players